Enlighten Me is the third full-length album by American singer-songwriter Jaymay, released in 2015. It was recorded in Los Angeles, California and at Snow God Studios in Brooklyn, New York.

"Never Weep" is adapted from and contains text from the poem entitled “For Una” by Robinson Jeffers.

"We Say Goodbye" is an alternate version of the recording from Jaymay In Norway (2014).

Track listing
All songs written by Jaymay
 "I Stand Up For Me" - 3:28
 "Baby Maybe One Day" - 2:36
 "For Goodness Sake" - 1:53
 "Never Weep" - 3:25
 "Should Have Known" - 0:51
 "Enlighten Me" - 7:07
 "Singin' Of The Birds" - 2:13
 "There Are Red Roses" - 3:08
 "Today & Tmoro" - 3:31
 "Just Got Over You" - 2:12
 "We Say Goodbye" - 0:51

Personnel

Musicians
Jaymay
Jay Foote
Alex Foote
James McAlister
Patrick MacDougall
Karen Waltuch
Aaron Dugan
Nico Georis
Mike Block
Elmo Lovano

Production
Jaymay - Producer, Engineer
Jay Foote - Producer, Engineer
Patrick MacDougall - Engineer, Mixing, Mastering 
Roc Morin - Photography

References

2015 albums
Jaymay albums